Jassim bin Hamad bin Khalifa Al Thani (born 25 August 1978) is the former heir apparent of Qatar. He is the third son of the former Emir of Qatar, Sheikh Hamad bin Khalifa Al Thani, and the first child of the Emir with his second wife, Sheikha Moza bint Nasser Al-Missned. He abdicated his position as Crown Prince in 2003, in favour of his younger brother Tamim, citing being uninterested in becoming Emir.

Early life and education
Sheikh Jassim is the third son of the former emir of Qatar, Hamad bin Khalifa Al Thani. His mother is Moza bint Nasser Al-Missned, second wife of his father. He was educated at the Royal Military Academy Sandhurst.
He attended International College, Sherborne School in Dorset.

Career
After graduation Sheikh Jassim was commissioned as 2nd-lieutenant in the Qatari armed forces on 9 August 1996. He was appointed heir apparent of Qatar on 23 October 1996. He replaced Mishaal bin Hamad Al Thani, his older half-brother, in the post. Jassim renounced his rights in favour of his younger brother Sheikh Tamim on 5 August 2003. According to Qatar News Agency, Jassim sent a letter to his father saying, “The time is appropriate to step down and prepare for a successor”. In the letter, Jassim stated, “I did not want, as I have told you from the start, to be appointed as crown prince”, and noted he had only accepted the position in October 1996 because of "sensitive circumstances".

Jassim was the personal representative of the former emir. Sheikh Jassim is also honorary president of the Qatar National Cancer Society (QNCS) since 1997. Furthermore, he has been chair of the high committee for coordination and follow up since 1999, chair of the supreme council for the environment and natural resources since 2000. He is also patron of Aspire Academy since 2003. He is a member of the Board of Trustees at Qatar Foundation.

Marriage and children

Sheikh Jassim married his cousin, Sheikha Bothaina bint Hamad Al Thani, the daughter of Sheikh Hamad bin Ali Al Thani, at Al Wajbah Palace, Doha, on 30 March 2006. They have eight children, three sons and five daughters:
Sheikha Moza bint Jassim bin Hamad Al Thani 
Sheikh Fahad bin Jassim bin Hamad Al Thani 
Sheikha Hind bint Jassim bin Hamad Al Thani
Sheikh Hamad bin Jassim bin Hamad Al Thani 
Sheikh Tamim bin Jassim bin Hamad Al Thani 
Sheikha Al-Mayassa bint Jassim bin Hamad Al Thani 
Sheikha Dhai bint Jassim bin Hamad Al Thani 
Sheikha Ghand bint Jassim bin Hamad Al Thani

Ancestry

References

1978 births
Living people
House of Thani
Graduates of the Royal Military Academy Sandhurst
Heirs apparent who never acceded
Grand Cordons of the Order of Merit (Lebanon)
Sons of monarchs